Stathmopoda aristodoxa is a species of moth in the family Stathmopodidae. It is endemic to New Zealand. It is classified as "At Risk, Naturally Uncommon" by the Department of Conservation.

Taxonomy
This species was described by Edward Meyrick in 1926 using a specimen collected in Gollan's Valley, Wellington in November by George Hudson. Hudson discussed and illustrated the species in his 1928 book The Butterflies and Moths of New Zealand. He also adding to the recorded localities of this species in 1939.  The holotype specimen is held at the Natural History Museum, London.

Description
Meyrick described this species as follows:

Distribution
S. aristodoxa is endemic to New Zealand. Other than the type locality, this species has been recorded at Pohangina. This species is also regarded as being present in Auckland.

Biology and life cycle
Adult moths of this species are on the wing in November.

Host species and habitat
As this moth belongs to the genus Stathmopoda its larvae, like those of other species in the genus, may feed on scale insects.

Conservation Status 
This species has been classified as having the "At Risk, Naturally Uncommon" conservation status under the New Zealand Threat Classification System.

References

Moths described in 1926
Stathmopodidae
Moths of New Zealand
Endemic fauna of New Zealand
Endangered biota of New Zealand
Endemic moths of New Zealand